James Bate (10 April 1945 – 19 May 1992) was a British actor of television, film and stage, who was best known for playing David Allman in the ITV crime thriller series Sleuth.

Early life 
When he was three, Bate's family moved to Whitley Bay. His first venture came aged 13 when he started singing an accompanying himself on the guitar. Aged 17, Tony (as he was known) became an excellent guitarist and leader of a well respected local beat group, "The Strangers" who expanded with the addition of a singer into "The Sixteen Strings" and made a record before disbanding when Anthony [Tony] left for college. During this time, they performed cabaret, inserting more comedy into the act and performing in clubs. In between this, Tony also had a number of other jobs including working as a van driver, labourer and fitter of artificial limbs.

Moving to London, Tony sang in pubs and took whatever job he could find such as being an MC. After trying amateur theatre with the Chelsea Players, he gave up music, swapping it for acting, taking a two-year drama course at the Mount View Theatre School in Hornsey. This led to him playing Hamlet and Romeo on the campus and in a two-month tour of the United States arranged by the school. Upon returning home, the actor joined the Tyneside Theatre Company.

Career 
As a result of there already being an actor named Anthony Bate, he had chose James Bate as his professional name.

On TV, he made major appearances as Corporal Ernest Bright in six episodes of The Regiment (1973) and Sammy Fenwick in the television miniseries The Stars Look Down (1975). After guesting in various television shows including ITV Playhouse, Thriller (1 episode, 1974), and When the Boat Comes In, Bate struck gold when he was cast in the leading role of international spy David Allman in the ITV crime thriller series Sleuth, playing the role for four series between 1977 and 1980. This was followed by roles in notable shows such as Amyand in the Doctor Who serial "Planet of Fire" (1984) and Malcolm Hopwood in Auf Wiedersehen, Pet (1986). Bate's final screen role as Stonker in one episode of Spender opposite Jimmy Nail.

Death 
James died in London's Charing Cross Hospital after suffering a massive haemorrhage. He is buried in Whitley Bay Cemetery.

References

External links 

English male television actors
1945 births
1992 deaths
male actors from Leeds
20th-century English male actors